Brindley Charles (born 4 August 1948) is a Dominican cricketer. He played in one first-class match for the Windward Islands in 1972/73.

See also
 List of Windward Islands first-class cricketers

References

External links
 

1948 births
Living people
Dominica cricketers
Windward Islands cricketers